Maurice Ross may refer to:

 Maurice Ross, Scottish football player and coach
 Maurice A. Ross, associate judge on the Superior Court of the District of Columbia